St Joseph's Catholic School is a coeducational Roman Catholic secondary school in Laverstock, near Salisbury in Wiltshire, England.

It is a voluntary aided school administered by Wiltshire Council and the Roman Catholic Diocese of Clifton. The school offers GCSEs and BTECs as programmes of study for pupils.

References

External links
 

Secondary schools in Wiltshire
Catholic secondary schools in the Diocese of Clifton
Voluntary aided schools in England